Gud-e Lasiah (also Romanized as Gūd-e Lāsīāh; also known as Jānīābād) is a village in Kavirat Rural District, Chatrud District, Kerman County, Kerman Province, Iran. At the 2006 census, its population was 16, in 4 families.

References 

Populated places in Kerman County